Aleksandr Myzgin (born 22 April 1964 in Gomel, Byelorussian SSR) is a Soviet sprint canoer who competed from the mid-1980s to the early 1990s. He won three medals at the ICF Canoe Sprint World Championships with two golds (K-4 10000 m: 1989, 1990) and a silver (K-4 1000 m: 1985).

References

Living people
Sportspeople from Gomel
Soviet male canoeists
1964 births
Belarusian male canoeists
ICF Canoe Sprint World Championships medalists in kayak
Honoured Masters of Sport of the USSR